The Knoxville NightHawks were a professional indoor football team based in Knoxville, Tennessee. The team was a member of the  Professional Indoor Football League (PIFL). The NightHawks joined the PIFL in 2012 as an expansion team. The NightHawks were the second indoor/arena football team based in Knoxville, following the Tennessee ThunderCats which played in the Indoor Professional Football League for the 2001 season before joining the National Indoor Football League where they played the 2002 and 2003 seasons (the latter of which they played as the Tennessee Riverhawks) before moving to Greenville, South Carolina. The Owner of the NightHawks was Southern Sports Entertainment, LLC. The NightHawks played their home games at the James White Civic Coliseum in Knoxville, Tennessee.

Franchise history

2012

The franchise was announced by Owner Jeff Knight on September 15, 2011. He announced the team's decision to join the Professional Indoor Football League and that the team would play at the James White Civic Coliseum. On October 4, 2011, the NightHawks named Chris MacKeown the team's first coach in franchise history. The team made a splash when they signed veteran NFL defensive lineman Chris Bradwell, and veteran Arena Football League quarterback, Tony Colston. In the team's first ever game, the NightHawks fell 45–70 to the Alabama Hammers. The team started 0–6 on the season before winning their 7th contest on May 5, 2012, an overtime victory over the Hammers. The team finished their inaugural season 1–11 with a 0.083 winning percentage, which was worst in the PIFL. Coach MacKeown said he felt that he would not be back for a second season with the team.

2013

In October 2012, the NightHawks named Cosmo DeMatteo the second head coach in franchise history. The NightHawks finished the 2013 season 2–10 with a 0.167 winning percentage, finishing in the bottom of the league.

Players of note

Final roster

Awards and honors
The following is a list of all NightHawks players who won league awards:

Coaches of note

Head coaches

Coaching staff

Season-by-season results

References

External links
Knoxville Nighthawks official site

 
2011 establishments in Tennessee
2013 disestablishments in Tennessee